Irene Palaiologina (1327 - after 1356) was a Byzantine princess and Bulgarian empress consort. She was also known as Maria Palaiologina (Μαρία Παλαιολογίνα).

Her parents were Andronikos III Palaiologos and Anna of Savoy, whilst her siblings were John V Palaiologos and Michael Palaiologos.

She married in 1336 Tsar Michael Asen IV of Bulgaria. In 1355, her husband was killed in battle with the Ottoman Turks near Sofia. Irene decide to stay a nun in the monastery in Mesembria (today Nesebar) and take the name Matiasa. She died around 1399 and was buried in Mesembria. 

Nothing else is known about her, except that she was an Orthodox Christian.

References 

Palaiologos dynasty
Sratsimir dynasty
Bulgarian consorts
14th-century Eastern Orthodox Christians
Daughters of Byzantine emperors
14th-century Bulgarian women
14th-century Byzantine women